The 2013 Tour of Oman was the fourth edition of the Tour of Oman cycling stage race. It was rated as a 2.HC event on the UCI Asia Tour, and was held from 11 to 16 February 2013, in Oman.

Froome's winning margin over runner-up Alberto Contador was 27 seconds, and Australian Cadel Evans completed the podium, twelve seconds behind Contador and 39 seconds down on Froome. In the race's other classifications, Froome also won the points classification, France's Kenny Elissonde of  won the white jersey for the youth classification, by placing eighth overall in the general classification, and  finished at the head of the teams classification.

Teams
Eighteen teams competed in the 2013 Tour of Oman. These included twelve UCI ProTour teams, five UCI Professional Continental teams, and a national team representing Japan.

The teams that participated in the race were:

Japan (national team)

Race overview

Stages

Stage 1
11 February 2013 – Al Musannah to Sultan Qaboos University,

Stage 2
12 February 2013 – Fanja in Bidbid to Al Bustan,

Stage 3
13 February 2013 – Nakhal Fort to Wadi Dayqah Dam,

Stage 4
14 February 2013 – Al Saltiyah in Samail to Jabal Al Akhdhar,

Stage 5
15 February 2013 – Al Alam Palace to Ministry of Housing in Boshar,

Stage 6
16 February 2013 – Hawit Nagam Park to Matrah Corniche,

Classification leadership

References

External links

2013
2013 in men's road cycling
2013 in Omani sport